Underworld is a 2003 action horror film directed by Len Wiseman and written by Danny McBride, based on a story by Kevin Grevioux, Wiseman and McBride. Kevin Grevioux wrote the original screenplay.  The film centers on the secret history of vampires and lycans (an abbreviated form of lycanthrope, which means werewolf). It is the first (chronologically, the second) installment in the Underworld franchise. The main plot revolves around Selene (Kate Beckinsale), a vampire Death Dealer hunting Lycans. She finds herself attracted to a human, Michael Corvin (Scott Speedman), who is being targeted by the Lycans. After Michael is bitten by a Lycan, Selene must decide whether to do her duty and kill him or go against her clan and save him. Alongside Beckinsale and Speedman, the film stars Michael Sheen, Shane Brolly, and Bill Nighy.

An international co-production between companies from the United Kingdom, Germany, Hungary, and the United States, the film was released on September 19, 2003. Upon its release, the film received generally negative reviews from critics, but a smaller number of reviewers praised elements such as the film's stylish Gothic visuals, the "icy English composure" in Kate Beckinsale's performance, and the extensively worked-out vampire–werewolf mythology that serves as the film's backstory. A surprise hit, the film grossed $95 million against a production budget of $22 million. The film was followed by Underworld: Evolution, released three years later, and by three other films.

Plot
For generations, a secret war has raged between vampires and Lycans, an ancient species of werewolf. The vampires gain the upper hand when Lycan leader Lucian seemingly dies at the hands of vampire Kraven, who becomes the second-in-command to the vampires' leading elders. Selene, a member of an elite group of vampire assassins known as "Death Dealers", continues to pursue the extermination of the Lycans despite other vampires no longer believing them to be a threat.

During a clash with the Lycans, Selene discovers that they are looking for Michael Corvin, a seemingly ordinary medical student. Ignoring Kraven’s insistence to ignore the situation, Selene privately investigates Michael. After approaching him, the pair find themselves pursued by a group of Lycans led by Lucian, who is still alive and manages to bite Michael during their escape. Since Kraven was the only witness to Lucian's supposed death, Selene comes to suspect that he lied about killing him and may be working with the Lycans.

After hiding Michael at a safe house, Selene returns to her coven's mansion and prematurely awakens Viktor, a hibernating elder vampire. Furious, Viktor refuses to believe Selene's warnings about Kraven's treachery, and reminds her that his fellow elder Marcus was supposed to be awakened before him. While awaiting Kraven's judgment for defying him, Selene binds Michael, fearing that the Lycans' bite will transform him into a werewolf when the full moon rises. As the two of them bond, she gradually tells him more about her past, revealing that Viktor adopted her and turned her into a vampire after her family's death at the hands of Lycans, leading her to start a vengeful campaign against them. Selene later manages to capture and abduct the Lycan scientist Singe, while the Lycans manage to capture Michael. While held captive in the Lycans' lair, Michael soon learns that Lucian was once in love with Viktor's daughter Sonja, and that Viktor murdered her after he discovered their forbidden affair. Lucian claims that Lycans were once slaves of vampires, and the war began when they rose up against them and fought for their freedom.

At the vampires' mansion, a captive Singe reveals that Selene was telling the truth about Kraven's betrayal, and he reveals why the Lycans want Michael: vampires and Lycans actually have a common ancestor, and Michael is a direct descendant of that ancestor. As an heir to the legendary "Corvinus" bloodline, he carries a unique genetic strain that could allow him to become a vampire-werewolf hybrid, which Singe predicts will lack the weaknesses of both species. An angered Viktor then kills Singe and mobilizes the Death Dealers to raid the Lycan’s lair to kill the remaining Lycans, including Michael. Meanwhile, vampire elder Amelia—the current ruler of the coven—is later ambushed and killed by Lycans while traveling to the mansion to awaken Marcus, having tracked her with the assistance of Kraven.

In the ensuing showdown between vampires and Lycans, Selene breaks into the Lycans' lair to rescue Michael. Kraven and Lucian turn on each other, and the latter tells Selene that Viktor was the one who really murdered her family and only spared and mentored her due to being reminded of his daughter. Selene is forced to bite a fatally injured Michael - believing that her bite will make him an immortal vampire-werewolf hybrid - while Kraven shoots Lucian, killing him.

When Viktor arrives at the Lycans' lair in the aftermath of the battle, he admits to murdering Selene's parents and killing his daughter. He also insists that he killed Sonja for the good of his people and reveals she was pregnant with Lucian's child, an abomination in the eyes of the two species. Lastly, he claims that he made Selene immortal out of love for her. Viktor proceeds to fight the hybrid Michael. At first, Viktor is overwhelmed by Michael’s strength but he eventually gets the upper hand and attempts to strangle him. Selene rouses from her disorientation and kills Viktor with his sword. Now enemies of both the vampires and the Lycans, Selene and Michael flee the Lycans' lair together.

Back at the vampires' mansion, Marcus — now the sole surviving vampire elder — awakens after Singe's blood seeps into his sarcophagus.

Cast

 Kate Beckinsale as Selene, a Death Dealer
 Scott Speedman as Michael Corvin, a medical student who becomes a hybrid 
 Bill Nighy as Viktor, the second most powerful of the vampire elders
 Michael Sheen as Lucian, the leader of the Lycans
 Shane Brolly as Kraven, a vampire noble who plots to kill the elders
 Erwin Leder as Singe, a Lycan scientist who plans with Lucian to make a hybrid creature
 Sophia Myles as Erika, a vampire courtesan who desires Kraven's favor
 Robbie Gee as Kahn, a vampire warrior who helps Selene
 Kevin Grevioux as Raze, Lucian's right-hand-man
 Zita Görög as Amelia, a vampire elder
 Scott McElroy as Soren, Kraven's henchman
 Wentworth Miller as Adam Lockwood, Michael's colleague
 Dennis Kozeluh as Dmitri
 Hank Amos as Nathaniel
 Sandor Bolla as Rigel
 Todd Schneider as Trix
 Jázmin Dammak as Sonja

Production
In 2000, Danny McBride met Len Wiseman through Nick Reed, who was the agent for both of them with intent for them to work together on a script the former wrote. While the plans for that film fizzled out, they did set out a plan to work together. Kevin Grevioux had graduated from Howard University with a degree in microbiology, but he developed a desire to study film in cinematography and screenwriting. He dropped out of graduate studies and moved to Los Angeles, where he became an actor. He came up with the original concept for the film, which was inspired by Romeo and Juliet alongside his college studies, which based vampirism and lycanthropy on a viral mutagen rather than mythology. McBride and Wiseman soon stepped in to work on the script, which they soon set out to make a trilogy of films. Each received credit for their work on the film, and Grevioux also appeared in the film as an actor.

Legal controversy
The film was the subject of a copyright infringement lawsuit filed by White Wolf, Inc. and Nancy A. Collins, claiming the setting was too similar to the Vampire: The Masquerade and Werewolf: The Apocalypse games, both set in the World of Darkness setting, and to the Sonja Blue vampire novels. White Wolf filed 17 counts of copyright infringement, and claimed over 80 points of unique similarity between White Wolf's gaming systems and the film.  One of those points being that the vampires in Underworld "drink blood".  White Wolf, Inc. also said the script was very similar to a story entitled The Love of Monsters (1994), which they published, written by Nancy A. Collins. In September 2003, a judge granted White Wolf an expedited hearing. The lawsuit ended in a confidential settlement.

Box office
The film grossed $51,970,690 in the US and $95,708,457 worldwide. Underworld was released on DVD and VHS on January 6, 2004 by Columbia TriStar Home Entertainment.

Reception
Underworld has a 31% overall approval rating on film-critics' aggregate site Rotten Tomatoes, based on 161 reviews. The site's consensus reads, "Though stylish to look at, Underworld is tedious and derivative." Audiences polled by CinemaScore gave the film an average grade of "B+" on an A+ to F scale.

Roger Ebert said, "This is a movie so paltry in its characters and shallow in its story that the war seems to exist primarily to provide graphic visuals" However, some critics were more favorable: the New York Daily News praised it as being "stylish and cruel, and mightily entertaining for certain covens out there".

Salon reviewer Andrew O'Hehir gave a mixed review, stating, "by any reasonable standard, this dark vampire epic — all massive overacting, cologne-commercial design and sexy cat suits — sucks," but that "at least it gives a crap", conceding that despite the movie's flaws, the complex vampire-werewolf mythology backstory "has been meticulously worked out".

Music

Soundtrack

The film's soundtrack was produced by Danny Lohner and distributed via Roadrunner Records.
Lohner (born 1970), a bass guitarist, guitarist, and keyboardist who has recorded with Nine Inch Nails and Marilyn Manson, contributed several songs to the soundtrack under the pseudonym Renholdër. Lohner included a song by Skinny Puppy, a Canadian industrial band; a song by The Dillinger Escape Plan, a US band which performs an aggressive, technical style of hardcore punk called mathcore; a song by US alternative rock/post-hardcore band Finch entitled "Worms of the Earth"; a song by The Icarus Line, a band known for its abrasive form of rock music; and Lisa Germano, an American singer/songwriter and multi-instrumentalist who specializes in alternative rock and dream pop.

Music critic Bill Aicher noted that the "soundtrack follow[s] in a similar gothic vein" to the visuals, and stated that it "does an excellent job setting the dark mood" by using "a veritable who's who in the genre", with an "impressive array of metal, hard rock, industrial, and otherwise gothic-themed tracks". Aicher noted that since "a majority of the selections [are] written, produced, or featuring Lohner, the album retains a sense of cohesion throughout, making it much more a complete product than has generally been the case with similarly-themed products." In particular, Aicher praised the rearrangement of David Bowie's "Bring Me the Disco King" (previously released in its original form on his studio album Reality earlier that month) as the soundtrack's strongest piece. This version of the song, which features Maynard James Keenan (from Tool and A Perfect Circle) and guitarist John Frusciante (of the Red Hot Chili Peppers), was praised by Aicher as "Dark, brooding, sad, and twitchy".

Track listing

Sequels and prequel
A sequel, titled Underworld: Evolution, in which Marcus fully awakens, was released January 20, 2006. The prequel Underworld: Rise of the Lycans, which gives more detail about the creation of the Lycan species and Lucian's hatred, was released January 23, 2009. A second sequel, Underworld: Awakening, was released on January 20, 2012, and a third sequel, Underworld: Blood Wars, was released on January 6, 2017.

See also
Vampire film

References

External links

 
 
  
 
 

2003 films
2003 horror films
2000s action horror films
American dark fantasy films
German action horror films
Hungarian horror films
English-language German films
English-language Hungarian films
1
Films shot in Hungary
Films shot in Budapest
Girls with guns films
Films set in Budapest
American films about revenge
Films shot in the Czech Republic
Lakeshore Entertainment films
Screen Gems films
Films directed by Len Wiseman
Films produced by Tom Rosenberg
Films produced by Gary Lucchesi
Films scored by Paul Haslinger
British vampire films
British werewolf films
Films involved in plagiarism controversies
British action horror films
American action horror films
2003 directorial debut films
American werewolf films
2000s English-language films
2000s American films
2000s British films
2000s German films